Erik Keedus (born 27 April 1990) is an Estonian professional basketball player for TalTech of the Estonian Korvpalli Meistriliiga. He is a 1.98 m (6 ft 6 in) tall shooting guard and small forward. Keedus represents the Estonian national basketball team internationally.

Professional career
Keedus began playing basketball with Siili Palliklubi and TTÜ. He began his professional career in 2007 with TTÜ of the Estonian Korvpalli Meistriliiga. In 2013, Keedus helped TTÜ win the inaugural season of the International Students Basketball League.

On 9 September 2014, Keedus signed for the Estonian champions Kalev/Cramo. Kalev/Cramo finished the 2014–15 season as runners-up. Keedus won his first Estonian Championship in the 2015–16 season, after Kalev/Cramo defeated TÜ/Rock in the finals.

Estonian national team
Keedus was a member of the Estonian national under-18 basketball team that competed at the 2008 FIBA Europe Under-18 Championship. The team finished the tournament last, in 16th place. Keedus averaged 5.3 points, 4 rebounds and 1.7 assists per game.

As a member of the senior Estonian national basketball team, Keedus competed at the EuroBasket 2015, averaging 4.5 points and 1.5 rebounds in 19 minutes per game. Estonia finished the tournament in 20th place.

Awards and accomplishments

Professional career
TTÜ
 International Students Basketball League champion: 2013

Kalev/Cramo
 4× Estonian League champion: 2016, 2017, 2018, 2019
 2× Estonian Cup champion: 2015, 2016

References

External links
 Erik Keedus at basket.ee 
 Erik Keedus at fiba.com

1990 births
Living people
BC Kalev/Cramo players
Estonian men's basketball players
Korvpalli Meistriliiga players
Shooting guards
Small forwards
Basketball players from Tallinn
TTÜ KK players